C C Land Holdings Limited is a manufacturer of packaging products and travel bags. The company is also involved in property development, mainly in Chongqing, China.

The company was formerly known as Qualipak International Holdings Limited. In 2006, its business was transformed to be a property developer through the acquisition of Chongqing Zhongyu Property Development Company Limited. In 2007, it changed its name to C C Land Holdings Limited.

In March 2017, CC Land bought London's Leadenhall Building for £1.15 billion.

References

External links
 
C C Land Holdings Limited
Chongqing Zhongyu Property Development Co., Ltd

Companies listed on the Hong Kong Stock Exchange
Real estate companies of China
Privately held companies of China
Real estate companies established in 1992
Companies based in Chongqing
Manufacturing companies of Hong Kong
Chinese companies established in 1992